Surojit Bose (born 19 December 1986) is an Indian footballer from Kolkata who currently plays for Mumbai Tigers. He has previously played for Mahindra United in the I-League, and for Bengal in the Santosh Trophy. Before joining Mahindra United, he played for Tollygunge Agragami and Mohun Bagan. Apart from football, he is a big fan of driving.

References

1986 births
Living people
Bengali sportspeople
Footballers from Kolkata
Indian footballers
I-League players
Mohun Bagan AC players
Mahindra United FC players
Mohammedan SC (Kolkata) players
ONGC FC players
Mumbai Tigers FC players
United SC players
Bharat FC players
India international footballers
Association football forwards
Tollygunge Agragami FC players